Raymond Jay Castellani (February 13, 1933 – October 18, 2021) was an American character actor. As a former alcoholic, he founded the Frontline Foundation, which serves meals to the homeless on the Los Angeles' Skid Row.

Castellani was born in Albany, New York on February 13, 1933. In 1995, Castellani received the Presidential Citizens Medal from President Bill Clinton at a White House ceremony. During the early 1990s, President George H. W. Bush included Castellani among his "thousand points of light." He attended The Albany Academy, class of 1952. Upon graduation, he spent a semester at Springfield College. During this time he received a draft notice, and then served as a Marine during the Korean War.

During the 1950s and 1960s, Castellani acted in numerous plays, television shows, and films, including
Bonanza, Lawman, and Dragnet. Often he played villains. As Castellani's alcoholism increased, his career suffered and his acting skills eroded. Despite this, he appeared in television shows such as, The Dakotas, Adam-12, Temple Houston, Night Gallery,  Simon and Simon, Kojak, Planet of the Apes, McNaughton's Daughter, Judd for the Defense, The D.A., Sam, Mobile One, Emergency!, Quincy, The Redd Foxx Show, Lucan, Turnabout, General Hospital, CHiPs, Riker, and Oklahoma City Dolls.

In New York, he appeared in plays such as The Curious Savage, Hat Full of Rain, The Rain Maker, What Makes Sammy Run, and Light Up the Sky.
During the 1970s, Castellani occasionally found himself homeless on Skid Row in Los Angeles. Castellani returned to acting in the 1980s, but quit to found the Frontline Foundation in 1987. As of January 2011, he continues to operate this charity.

In 2008, Castellani released an autobiography titled, The End Was But A Beginning: A True Story.

He served over one million meals on the streets of Skid Row in downtown Los Angeles. He died on October 18, 2021, at the age of 88.

References

External links
Frontline Foundation Official website
 

1933 births
2021 deaths
American male stage actors
American male television actors
Philanthropists from New York (state)
American anti-poverty advocates
Homeless people
Actors from Albany, New York
Activists from New York (state)
The Albany Academy alumni